Skamni Saddle (‘Sedlovina Skamni’ \se-dlo-vi-'na 'skam-ni\) is the 1.3 km long ice-covered saddle of elevation 1750 m in northern Sentinel Range, Ellsworth Mountains in Antarctica connecting Mount Wyatt Earp on the northwest to Matsch Ridge in Gromshin Heights on the southeast.

The saddle is named after Skamni Point on the Bulgarian Black Sea Coast.

Location
US mapping in 1961.

Maps
 Newcomer Glacier.  Scale 1:250 000 topographic map.  Reston, Virginia: US Geological Survey, 1961.
 Antarctic Digital Database (ADD). Scale 1:250000 topographic map of Antarctica. Scientific Committee on Antarctic Research (SCAR). Since 1993, regularly updated.

References
 Skamni Saddle. SCAR Composite Gazetteer of Antarctica.
 Bulgarian Antarctic Gazetteer. Antarctic Place-names Commission. (details in Bulgarian, basic data in English)

External links
 Skamni Saddle. Copernix satellite image

Ellsworth Mountains
Bulgaria and the Antarctic
Mountain passes of Ellsworth Land